Giovanni Chinugi (died 1470) was a Roman Catholic prelate who served as Bishop of Pienza e Montalcino (1462–1470)
and Bishop of Chiusi (1462).

Biography
On 6 October 1462, Giovanni Chinugi was appointed during the papacy of Pope Pius II as Bishop of Chiusi.
The following day, 7 October 1462, he was appointed Bishop of Pienza e Montalcino.<ref 
He served as Bishop of Pienza e Montalcino until his death on 30 September 1470.<ref

References

External links and additional sources
 (for Chronology of Bishops) 
 (for Chronology of Bishops) 
 (for Chronology of Bishops) 
 (for Chronology of Bishops) 

15th-century Italian Roman Catholic bishops
Bishops appointed by Pope Pius II
1470 deaths